Albert Eugene Haylett (September 17, 1903 – December 8, 1965) was an American football and basketball coach.  He was the 22nd head football coach at Doane College in Crete, Nebraska, serving for nine seasons, from 1933 to 1941, and compiling a record of 34–30–8.  Haylett was also the head basketball coach at Doane from 1933 to 1942, tallying a mark of 84–62.

Head coaching record

Football

References

External links
 

1903 births
1965 deaths
Basketball coaches from Nebraska
Doane Tigers football coaches
Doane Tigers men's basketball coaches